Lootcase is a 2020 Indian black comedy crime film directed by Rajesh Krishnan, of TVF Tripling fame. The film is produced and bankrolled by Fox Star Studios. It features Kunal Kemmu and Rasika Dugal in lead roles, and Vijay Raaz, Ranvir Shorey and Gajraj Rao in supporting roles. The film revolves around a red coloured suitcase (Joy Bagman/ Anand Petikar). It was scheduled for theatrical release on 10 April 2020, but the release was postponed due to COVID-19 pandemic. It was released on 31 July 2020 on Disney+ Hotstar. 

Upon release on Disney+Hotstar, it received generally positive reviews from critics. The story, direction, performances of the cast (especially Khemu), cinematography, editing, and dark humor were praised.

Plot
 
Nandan Kumar, a middle-class man who repairs machines at a printing press, doesn't believe in destiny and lives in a chawl with his taunting wife Lata and son Ayush. Nandan's family struggles to reconcile their dreams and aspirations with their financial reality.

MLA Patil attempts to transfer Rs. 100 million and a file containing evidence of widespread embezzlement to another minister. He blackmails local gangster Omar to carry out this task; his men put the money in a red suitcase. While transporting the money, Omar's men are ambushed by the goons of rival gangster Bala Rathore. Patil's men hide the suitcase during the shootout, hoping to retrieve it later. However, Nandan comes across it by chance, and finding it full of money, decides to take it home and hides it in his neighbor's home as his neighbour (an old man) has gone to his village and gave the keys to Nandan 
while going.  When Bala and Patil realize that the suitcase (and the file) is missing, they send their respective men to find it at any cost. Patil additionally blackmails policeman Kolte and recruits him to retrieve the suitcase.

Kolte and his informant Faizu gather information about the shootout but find that nearby CCTV cameras are not operational. Meanwhile, Nandan spends some money on his family but doesn't reveal the money's source to Lata. Bala's men spot Faizu, and start tracking Kolte. Nandan removes some of the money from the suitcase, divides it into several packets, and hides them around the house, keeping one packet in his office drawer. One CCTV camera becomes operational, allowing Kolte to see Nandan leaving the scene in an auto-rickshaw. Meanwhile, Nandan has his hands full in attempting to keep his money hidden from his neighbors and Lata. In an effort to spend his cash, he attempts to buy a luxurious apartment only to find that they do not accept cash payments.

Kolte finds the auto-rickshaw driver from the CCTV footage, and is able to identify Nandan (the driver had spotted Nandan's debit card with his name and bank information). Nandan goes to his bank to inquire about a cash-counting machine, but the cashiers laugh him off. Paranoid, he makes a scene and leaves. When Kolte is investigating at the same bank, the cashiers tell him about Nandan's suspicious behavior and provide him Nandan's address. Kolte arrives at his home just as Lata finds the hidden suitcase in the kitchen. Kolte holds the family at gunpoint and demands the money back and Nandan complies. Kolte finds out about the packet in the office, and takes Nandan to retrieve it. Bala's men report this to their boss, and Bala and Patil join hands to kill Kolte and recover the money.

When Kolte and Nandan arrive at the office, Kolte sends Nandan inside to get the money. As soon as Nandan leaves, Kolte is ambushed by Bala's men. He manages to escape and finds Patil's file; realising its importance, he decides to blackmail Patil. Meanwhile Nandan is held up by his drunk boss as he attempts to get the packet. Kolte instructs him to come to a secret warehouse. Nandan manages to get there but Bala and Omar ambush the warehouse with their respective men. In the resulting shootout, Nandan is the only survivor. Not learning his lesson about greed, he decides to take the money at the warehouse, but leaves the file. When the contents of the file are leaked, Patil's political career is doomed. He retires to his village and takes up farming, but is quickly tracked down and murdered by Omar's men.

Cast 
 Kunal Khemu as Nandan Kumar, Lata's husband
 Rasika Dugal as Lata Kumar, Nandan's wife
 Vijay Raaz as Gangster Bala Rathod
 Ranvir Shorey as Inspector Madhav Kolte, a corrupt officer in the Mumbai Police Crime Branch 
 Gajraj Rao as MLA Suyash Patil
 Aryan Prajapati as Ayush Kumar, Nandan and Lata's son
 Shashi Ranjan as Abdul
 Sumit Nijhawan as Omar Siddiqui
 Nilesh Diwekar as Rajan Singh, Bala's henchman
 Aakash Dabhade as Graduate, Bala's henchman
 Atul Todankar as Subhash Raman, Patil's personal assistant
 Vijay Nikam as Vasant Seth, newspaper press owner

Production 
The filming started in the mid July 2019.

Release 
The first look poster was released on 16 September 2019. The film was scheduled to be released on 10 April 2020 but was indefinitely postponed due to the COVID-19 pandemic. On 29 June 2020, Disney+ Hotstar conducted virtual press conference where Uday Shankar announced that the film will release on Disney+ Hotstar exclusively as part of Disney+ Hotstar Multiplex initiative. It was released on 31 July 2020.

Soundtrack 

The music for the film was composed by Rohan-Vinayak and Amar Mangrulkar, while the lyrics written by Shreyas Jain and Kapil Sawant.

Accolades

Notes

References

External links
 
 

2020s Hindi-language films
Indian comedy thriller films
Fox Star Studios films
Disney+ Hotstar original films
2020 comedy films
2020s comedy thriller films
2020 thriller films